Anle Township is a township under the administration of Mouding County in Chuxiong Yi Autonomous Prefecture, Yunnan, China. , it has 13 villages under its administration.

References 

Township-level divisions of Chuxiong Yi Autonomous Prefecture
Mouding County